Samphire is a name given to several unrelated, edible plants that grow in coastal areas.

Samphire may also refer to:

 Samphire Hoe, Kent, England
 Samphire Island, Tasmania, Australia
 HMS Samphire (K128), a ship